The Opera Game was an 1858 chess game, played at an opera house in Paris. The American master Paul Morphy played against two strong amateurs: the German noble Karl II, Duke of Brunswick, and the French aristocrat Comte Isouard de Vauvenargues. The game was played in a box while an opera was performed on stage.

It is among the most famous of chess games. The game is often used by chess instructors to teach the importance of piece development, the value of sacrifices in mating combinations, and other concepts.

The game
White: Paul Morphy  Black: Duke of Brunswick and Count Isouard  Opening: Philidor Defence (ECO C41) Paris, October/November 1858

1. e4 e5 2. Nf3 d6
This is Philidor's Defence, named after François-André Danican Philidor, the leading chess master of the second half of the 18th century and a pioneer of modern chess strategy. He was also a noted opera composer. It is a solid opening, but slightly passive, and it ignores the important d4-square. Most modern players prefer 2...Nc6 or 2...Nf6, the Petrov Defence.

3. d4 Bg4
Though common at the time, 3...Bg4 is considered inferior. Today 3...exd4 or 3...Nf6 are usual. Philidor's original idea, 3...f5, is a risky alternative. Bobby Fischer, in his analysis of the game, calls it a weak move. 

4. dxe5 Bxf3
If 4...dxe5, then 5.Qxd8+ Kxd8 6.Nxe5 and White wins a pawn and Black has lost the ability to castle, and White is threatening Nxf7+ winning the rook. Black, however, did have the option of 4...Nd7 5.exd6 Bxd6, when he is down a pawn but has some compensation in the form of better development.

5. Qxf3
Steinitz's recommendation 5.gxf3 dxe5 6.Qxd8+ Kxd8 7.f4 is also good, but Morphy prefers to keep the queens on. After Black recaptures the pawn on e5, White has a significant lead in development. Queen capturing is the most natural move as it keeps a healthy kingside pawn structure.

5...dxe5 6. Bc4 Nf6
This seemingly sound developing move runs into a surprising . After White's next move, both f7 and b7 will be under attack. Better would have been to directly protect the f7-pawn with 6...Qd7, making White's next move less potent.

7. Qb3 Qe7 (diagram)
Black's only good move. White was threatening mate in two moves, for example 7...Nc6 8.Bxf7+ Ke7 (or Kd7) 9.Qe6#. 7...Qd7 loses the rook to 8.Qxb7 followed by 9.Qxa8 (since 8...Qc6? would lose the queen to 9.Bb5). Notice that 7...Qe7 saves the rook with this combination: 8.Qxb7 Qb4+ forcing a queen exchange.

Although this move prevents immediate disaster, Black is forced to block the f8-bishop, impeding development and  castling.

8. Nc3
Morphy could have won a pawn by 8.Qxb7 Qb4+ 9.Qxb4 Bxb4+. White can also win more material with 8.Bxf7+ Qxf7 9.Qxb7, but Black has dangerous counterplay after 9...Bc5 and 10.Qxa8 0-0, or 10.Qc8+ Ke7 11.Qxh8 Bxf2+!. "But that would have been a butcher’s method, not an artist's." (Lasker). In keeping with his style, Morphy prefers rapid development and initiative over material.

8... c6

9. Bg5 b5?
This move loses but it is difficult to find anything better; for example 9...Na6 10.Bxf6 gxf6 11.Bxa6 bxa6 12.Qa4 Qb7 and Black's position is very weak.

10. Nxb5!
Morphy chooses not to retreat the bishop, which would allow Black to gain time for development. 

10... cxb5
Black could have prolonged the game by playing 10...Qb4+, forcing the exchange of queens, but White wins comfortably after either 11.Nc3 or 11.Qxb4 Bxb4+ 12.c3!

11. Bxb5+
Not 11.Bd5? Qb4+, unpinning the knight and allowing the rook to evade capture.

11... Nbd7 
11...Kd8 holds out longer, but 12.0-0-0+ still gives White a winning attack.

12. 0-0-0 Rd8 (diagram)
The combination of the pins on the knights and the open file for White's rook will lead to Black's defeat.  

13. Rxd7 Rxd7
Removing another defender.

14. Rd1
White's piece activity is in marked contrast to black's passivity. Black's d7-rook cannot be saved, since it is pinned to the king by the bishop and attacked by the rook, and though the knight defends it, the knight is pinned to the queen.

14... Qe6
Qe6 is a futile attempt to unpin the knight (allowing it to defend the rook) and offer a queen trade, to take some pressure out of the white attack. Even if Morphy did not play his next crushing move, he could have always traded his bishop for the knight, followed by winning the rook.

15. Bxd7+ Nxd7
If 15...Qxd7, then 16.Qb8+ Ke7 17.Qxe5+ Kd8 18.Bxf6+ gxf6 19.Qxf6+ Kc8 20.Rxd7 Kxd7 21.Qxh8 and White is clearly winning. Moving the king leads to mate: 15...Ke7 16.Qb4+ Qd6 (16...Kd8 17.Qb8+ Ke7 18.Qe8#) 17.Qxd6+ Kd8 18.Qb8+ Ke7 19.Qe8# or 15...Kd8 16.Qb8+ Ke7 17.Qe8#.

16. Qb8+!
Morphy finishes with a queen sacrifice.

16... Nxb8 17. Rd8 

This mating pattern is sometimes called the "opera mate" in reference to this game.  Other than the king, all of White's remaining pieces play a role in the checkmate.  Therefore, the position satisfies the definition of an economical mate.  Economical mate is one of a few terms used by chess problem composers to describe the aesthetic properties of a checkmate position; related concepts include pure mate, model mate, and ideal mate.  The final position nearly satisfies the criteria of a model mate, but fails for one reason: there are two reasons why the black king cannot be moved to the square f8.  It is occupied by a bishop of the same color, and it is guarded by the white rook.

Notes

References

Further reading

 The Exploits & Triumphs in Europe of Paul Morphy the Chess Champion by Frederick Milne Edge, with a new introduction by David Lawson. Dover 1973; 203 pages.

External links
 Le mat de l'opéra , variations of the game's final in other chessproblems and games, 2 July 2008 
 Video commentary on the game by Bobby Fischer

Chess games
Chess in France
Opera history
1858 in chess
1858 in France
October 1858 sports events
1850s in Paris
Nicknamed sporting events